The Williamsburg High School for Architecture and Design, commonly called WHSAD, Architecture and Design or A&D, is a 9-12th grade New York City college-preparatory public high school that specializes in the integration of architecture, design, and historic preservation in its classes.

Williamsburg, Brooklyn
Public high schools in Brooklyn